Prince Firouz Nosrat-ed-Dowleh III, GCMG (1889–1937) was the eldest son of Prince Abdol-Hossein Farmanfarma and Princess Ezzat-ed-Dowleh Qajar. He was born in 1889 and died in April 1937. He was the grandson of his namesake, Nosrat Dowleh Firouz Mirza, and of Mozzafar-al-Din Shah Qajar through his mother, Princess Ezzat-Dowleh.

Biography
Records are unclear, but the prince is said to have been born around 1889. He was educated at the American University of Beirut and at the Sorbonne in Paris. He spoke five languages (Persian, French, English, Russian, and German) and attended Lycee Janson de Sailly in Paris and Institut Le Rosey in Switzerland. As surnames had not been established in Persia at the time of his studies in France, he registered himself as "Firouz Firouz", using his grandfather's name as his surname. Afterwards, when the Persian government made surnames mandatory by law, his father Prince Abdol-Hossein Farmanfarma picked the surname Farmanfarmaian for himself and his children. However, three of his children – Nosrat-ed-Dowleh, one of his 23 brothers (also a son of Princess Ezzat-ed-Dowleh), and one of his 12 sisters (daughter of Princess Ahshami) – held on to the surname "Firouz" and became known as Firouz Firouz, Mohammad Hossein Firouz, and Maryam Firouz, respectively.

Nosrat-ed-Dowleh was Minister of Foreign Affairs under Ahmad Shah Qajar; architect of the ill-fated Anglo-Persian Agreement (1919); and a candidate for accession to the Qajar throne after Soltan Ahmad Shah's exile and removal. In 1921, during the coup which brought Reza Shah to power, he spent three months in the Qasr-e-Qajar jail with his father and younger brother, Abbas Mirza Salar Lashgar, while Reza Shah consolidated his power base. During his stay at the prison, which he had helped build, he often boasted about its cleanliness. Nosrat-ed-Dowleh also translated Oscar Wilde's De Profundis during this time. Following his release, he continued his public life for nine more years, serving as a member of parliament, provincial governor, minister of justice, and minister of finance.

In June 1930, while he was Finance Minister for Reza Shah, the Shah had him arrested for accepting a bribe in the amount of five hundred tomans (about 100 dollars today). This episode deeply alarmed Nosrat-ed-Dowleh's father, Abdol Hossein Mirza Farmanfarma, who warned his son to curb his extravagant princely lifestyle. The warnings were not heeded. Towards the end of 1936, Reza Shah had grown more tyrannical and unpredictable than in the past. Eventually, Nosrat-ed-Dowleh was arrested by the Tehran police chief, Mokhtari, and held in a Tehran prison. Despite pleas from the Farmanfarma family, he was not released, but instead transferred to a guarded house in Semnan, a village about eighty miles east of Tehran, where he was held incommunicado. In 1937, news returned to Nosrat-ed-Dowleh's father that his son was dead. The Shah had ordered that he be buried without any ceremonies or mention in the press. Abdol Hossein Mirza Farmanfarma ensured that his son was buried in the Shrine of Shah Abdol Azim, where many other leading personalities of the Qajar dynasty had been buried. Not long after Nosrat-ed-Dowleh's death, Reza Shah seized his compound.

It was eventually revealed that he had been killed in his room by strangulation under the supervision of a doctor named Ahmadi. In 1940, after Reza Shah abdicated in favour of his son, the courts found Dr. Ahmadi guilty of killing dozens of political prisoners and sentenced him to death by hanging. Mokhtari was sentenced to a long prison term.

Honors

 Knight Grand Cross of the Order of St Michael and St George, 1919

Government positions held

 Governor of Kerman, 1907
 Minister of Justice (1st time), 1916–1917
 Governor of Hamadan and Kermanshah, 1918
 Minister of Justice (2nd time), 1918–1919
 Minister for Foreign Affairs, 1919–1921
 Governor-General of Fars 1923–1924
 Minister of Justice (3rd time), 1925
 Minister for Finance, 1927–1929
 Deputy for Kermanshah in the 4th, 5th and 6th Majles

See also
 History of Persia
 History of Iran
 Qajar dynasty of Iran
 Abdolhossein Teymourtash

External links
 Biography (PDF; English; 596 kB)
 The Qajar (Kadjar) Pages

References

1889 births
1937 deaths
Foreign ministers of Iran
Iranian expatriates in France
Iranian expatriates in Lebanon
Iranian expatriates in Switzerland
Knights Grand Cross of the Order of St Michael and St George
Politicians from Tehran
Qajar princes
Reformers' Party politicians
Revival Party politicians
Ministers of Justice of Iran
Farmanfarmaian family
Alumni of Institut Le Rosey